Calyptra fletcheri is a moth of the family Erebidae. It has been found in China.

References

Calpinae
Moths described in 1956